The council–manager government is a form of local government used for municipalities, counties, or other equivalent regions. It is one of the two most common forms of local government in the United States along with the mayor–council government form, and is common in Ireland. The council–manager form is also used in New Zealand for regional councils, and in Canada and many other countries for city and county councils.

Overview
The city manager–council form is much like a publicly traded corporation. Under the form, an elected governing body, usually called a city council, board of aldermen, or similar title, is responsible for legislative functions such as establishing policy, passing local ordinances, voting appropriations, and developing an overall vision, similar to a corporate board of directors. The council appoints a city manager to oversee the administrative operations, implement its policies, and advise it. The manager position is similar to that of a corporate chief executive officer appointed by a board of directors. The position of "mayor" present in this type of legislative body is a largely ceremonial title, and may be selected by the council from among its members or elected as an at-large council member with no executive functions, similar to a non-executive chairman in a corporation.

The International City/County Management Association (ICMA), a professional organization for city managers, has listed at least three defining characteristics that distinguish a true council–manager government:
 All governmental authority rests with the council or other elected body, except for certain executive or administrative duties that are assigned to the manager. However, the manager always is employed at the pleasure of the elected body.
 The manager is allocated their functions in codified form by the city charter or other law, not assigned them ad hoc by a mayor.
 The manager must be responsible to, hired by, and can be dismissed only by the entire council, not one individual, such as a mayor or chairperson.

This system of government is used in 40.1% of American cities with populations of 2,500 or more, according to the 2011 Municipal Yearbook published by ICMA.

History in the United States
The concept of the council–manager form of government was a product of a confluence of the prevailing modes of thought during the late 19th and early 20th centuries. Probably the foremost influence was the Progressive Movement; following along the thought lines of the movement, the municipal reformers of that time wanted to rid municipalities of the pervasive "political machine" form of government and the abuses of the spoils system. The thought was to have a politically impartial administrator or manager to carry out the administrative function.

Staunton, Virginia, is credited as the first American city to appoint a city manager, which it did in 1908. This appointment attracted attention to the fledgling profession and caught the eye of Richard S. Childs, who would become known as the "father" of the council–manager form of government. The first large city to adopt the council–manager form was Dayton, Ohio, in 1913.

The council–manager system has grown considerably in popularity since the start of the 20th century. In 1935, ICMA recognized 418 U.S. cities and seven counties using the system.

The council–manager form of government developed, at least in part, as a response to some perceived limitations of the city commission government form. Since it relies on candidates being elected at-large, minority populations are often unable to elect candidates of their choice. In addition, it may concentrate too much power in individual commissioners, who also manage city departments. The council–manager form became the preferred alternative for progressive reform. After World War I, few cities adopted the commission form and many cities using the commission plan switched to the council–manager form.

By 2001, 3,302 cities with a population over 2,500 and 371 counties used the council–manager system. Phoenix, Arizona, is the largest city in the United States to retain a council–manager government.

Since the turn of the 21st century, there have been studies about hybrid forms of local governments that take elements of both council–manager and mayor–council forms. The cities that have modified their organizational structure from one of the pure forms have been called "adaptive" forms.

History in the Republic of Ireland

Following the turmoil of World War I (1914–1918), the 1916 rising, the Irish War of Independence (1919–1921), and the Irish Civil War (1921–1923), the Irish government found it necessary to remove the members of several local authorities and replace them temporarily by paid commissioners.

Both Dublin and Cork city councils were so removed. In both cities, there was a body of opinion that the services provided by the councils were delivered more efficiently and fairly under the commissioners than under the previous system, where the executive function had been, in effect, vested in the councils and their committees.

In 1926, a committee of commercial and industrial interests in Cork came together to consider a scheme of city government. Having regard to the city's experience of commissioners and recent experience in the United States a council–manager plan of city government was proposed.

After discussion between the minister for local government and local representatives, the minister, Richard Mulcahy, introduced as a government measure, the Cork City Management Bill 1929 and it became law despite opposition. The minister proposed and the Oireachtas enacted similar provision for Dublin City in 1930. Similar laws were passed for Limerick in 1934 and Waterford in 1939 under the Fianna Fáil government.

Under the County Management Act 1940, which was brought into operation in August 1942, a county manager is the manager of every borough or town in that county, but since the 1990s, has the power to delegate these functions to any other officer of that borough or town council.

The system was modified also in subsequent legislation, particularly the City and County Management (Amendment) Act 1955, which made some adjustments to give greater power to the council members, and the Local Government Act 1985, which provided for the council–manager system in Galway City once detached for local government purposes from County Galway.

The above acts have been replaced since that time, in substantially the same form, by the Local Government Act 2001.

See also
Mayor–council government
City commission government
Executive arrangements in England
State of the City address

References

Bibliography

External links
City Mayors feature on US council managers
International City/County Management Association
National Civic League

Forms of local government
Local government in the United States
Local government in the Republic of Ireland